Eva Možná-Hojdarová (née Hojdarová, also Možná; born 30 October 1949) is a Czech chess player who holds the chess titles of Lady International Correspondence Chess Grand Master (LGM, 1996) and Woman FIDE Master (WFM, 1986). She is a three-time Czechoslovak Women's Chess Championship medalist (1972, 1975, 1978).

Biography
In the 1970s, Eva Možná-Hojdarová was one of the leading Czechoslovakian women's chess players. She has won three bronze medals in the Czech women's chess championships (1972, 1975, 1978).

Eva Možná-Hojdarová played for Czechoslovakia in the Women's Chess Olympiad:
 In 1972, at first reserve board in the 5th Chess Olympiad (women) in Skopje (+2, =2, -1).

In later years, Eva Možná-Hojdarová active participated in correspondence chess tournaments. She won with Czech Republic team 4th Ladies Correspondence Chess Olympiad (1992–1997). In 1990, Eva Možná-Hojdarová was awarded the ICCF Lady International Correspondence Chess Grand Master (LGM) title and received the Lady International Correspondence Chess Grand Master (LGM) title six years later.

References

External links
 
 
 
 

1949 births
Living people
Czechoslovak female chess players
Czech female chess players
Chess Woman FIDE Masters
Chess Olympiad competitors
20th-century chess players
Sportspeople from Prague